Colorado Amendment 36 was an initiated constitutional amendment on the ballot on November 2, 2004. It would have changed the way in which the state apportioned its electoral votes. Rather than assigning all of the state's electors to the candidate with a plurality of popular votes, under the amendment, Colorado would have assigned presidential electors proportionally to the statewide vote count, which would be a unique system (Nebraska and Maine assign electoral votes based on vote totals within each congressional district). The amendment did not pass.

Contents 
The amendment appeared on the ballot as follows:

Results 
The amendment ultimately failed, garnering only 34.78% of the vote:

Analysis 
The amendment is deeply intertwined with the 2004 presidential election, in which Republican George W. Bush ran against Democrat John Kerry.

As Colorado was expected to lean towards Bush, the passage of this amendment (generally favored by Democrats and opposed by Republicans), could have taken some electoral votes from Bush and assigned them to Kerry. Had such an apportionment been in place in 2000, Al Gore would have won the electoral college vote and become president.

However, as November 2004 neared, Colorado began to look increasingly like a swing state in which it was possible that Kerry would win. Many Democrats who had pushed for Amendment 36 therefore began to have second thoughts and withdrew their advocacy for and support of the amendment. This withdrawal of Democratic support has been blamed for the defeat of the ballot initiative on Election Day. In the end, Bush won the state, but this amendment would not have been sufficient for Kerry to win the election.

The applicability of this amendment to a presidential vote being conducted simultaneously was questioned and might have been the subject of a legal dispute had the amendment passed.

References

External links 
 Proposed text of Colorado Amendment 36
 Official results of vote on Colorado Amendment 36
 Pros and cons of Colorado Amendment 36

2004 United States presidential election by state
United States presidential elections in Colorado
Presidential
2004 Colorado ballot measures
Initiatives in the United States
Constitution of Colorado
Electoral system ballot measures in the United States